Series four of the UK version of Hell's Kitchen began on 13 April 2009 and finished on 27 April 2009.

Presenter
Angus Deayton did not return to present the show. The reason given for Deayton's dismissal was because he was involved in a series of disputes with head chef Marco Pierre White. Pierre White has discussed the reasons for his disagreements with Deayton, he commented that "His humour was forced, and negative. I would be working hard and he would be making jibes at where I came from and my name".

In March 2009 Claudia Winkleman, whom Marco Pierre White has described as "naturally funny", was confirmed as the new host.

Head Chef
Marco Pierre White returns as Head Chef/teacher for the second series running. He particularly stated in the first episode that he was "the only chef to return".

Celebrities
The eight celebrities taking part in this year's show were confirmed in April 2009:

Adrian Edmondson, an English actor, comedian, director and writer.
Anthea Turner, an English journalist, television presenter and media personality, most famous for presenting Blue Peter.
Bruce Grobbelaar, a former Rhodesian-Zimbabwean-British football goalkeeper.
Danielle Lineker (née Bux), a Welsh model (and Gary Lineker's wife).
Grant Bovey, Anthea Turner's husband and a businessman.
Jody Latham, an actor best known for his work on Channel 4 show Shameless.
Linda Evans, a Golden Globe-winning and Emmy nominated American actress from the 1980s ABC soap opera Dynasty.
Niomi McLean-Daley (Ms. Dynamite), a double Brit Award and three time MOBO Awards winning R&B, UK garage, and hip hop singer and rapper.

Format changes
Unlike in past series, this year there is only one kitchen being used in the show.

Waiters
In another change from previous series, White decides at the end of each night's service who will be a waiter in the next night's service, based on the celebrities' performances in the kitchen that night. Below is a chart showing the waiters for each night's service:

Eliminations
In previous series the viewers have decided who is eliminated from the show. This year, head chef Marco Pierre White decides who is eliminated, until there are four left. The viewers decide who wins out of the top four.

Key
 The Winner
 The Runner-Up
 Third Place
 Competing
 Quit
 Eliminated By Marco
 Eliminated By Public

 The first sacking was supposed to be on day 6 but White decided that Jody deserved 24 hours to redeem himself.
 Due to an outstanding performance Grobbelaar had immunity from being eliminated on day 9.
On Day 10, Bruce decided to voluntarily leave the show in place of the person that was going to be sacked.
 In a post-show interview, Evans revealed that she chose to participate in Hell's Kitchen in preference to "I'm A Celebrity Get Me Out Of Here! (2008)".

Television ratings

"—" denotes where information currently unavailable

Average: 4.014 million viewers / 17.34% viewer share

References

UK series 4
2009 British television seasons
Cooking competitions in the United Kingdom